Vadakkekara is a census town, in Paravur Taluk, Ernakulam District, Kerala state in India. It is also a part of Vadakkekara Grama Panchayat. Paravur town is situated 5 km from this village. The main centre in this village is Moothakunnam. Vadakkekara is one of the early formed panchayat in the state. The cultural and historical place in Ernakulam Dristrict, combines the parts of the early Muzaris. Maliankara is famous for being the landing place of St. Thomas.

History
Vadakkekara (meaning: northern land)  a panchayat situated in the north of Paravoor river. Vadakkekara consisted of Chittattukara, Pallipuram and Munambam. Vadakkekara was Kuttanad of Parur. Vadakkekara includes numerous islands and as the population increased the panchayat divided. Both British and Travancore has ruled here. British coins circulated here. Vadakkekara was the most important province under Parur Kingdom as it included Muziris where most of the Ships landed in the coasts of this panchayat. Kuriapilly Ferry connected Kottapuram Market. Vadakkekara was an assembly constituency.

Economy
Important jobs are boat making, fishing, coconut trade, coir making, toddy tapping. Thuruthipuram is a minor market in this panchayat.

Human Life
Hindu Ezhvas are the majority in population. Along with them, Muslims, Christians, Hindu Nairs, Dheevaras (settled mainly in Kunjithai, Chettikad , malienkara) are there.

Demographics
 India census, Vadakkekara had a population of 20099 with 9694 males and 10405 females.

Religious
 Moothakunnam Temple
 Chakumarasery Temple
 Ramankulangara Bhagavathy Temple 
 Kottuvallikad Temple
 Bhuvaneshvari Devi Temple, Thiruthipuram
 Sree Sastha Temple, Vavakadu
 Valathu devi Temple
 Unnimisiha Chapel, Madaplathuruth.
St.Louis Church (Thuruthippuram)
St. George Church (Madaplathuruth)
St.Antony's church, Chettikkad
Kottuvallikkad Alunkal Sree Badrakali Temple Fest

Institutions
 SNM Higher Secondary School Moothakunnam.
HMDP Sabha formed in 1882 is the most old sangam. This resulted in the formation of several other institutions.

Localities
Maliankara, Kottuvallikkad, Moothakunnam, Madaplathuruth, Andipillykavu, Thuruthipuram, Muruvanthuruth, Oravanthuruth, Kattathuruth, Paliathuruth, Vavakkad, Kunjithai, Chettikkad.

Notable people
Paravoor Bharathan
Salim Kumar

References

External links

Villages in Ernakulam district